René-Arthur Fréchet (June 6, 1879 – May 28, 1950) was a Canadian architect who was active in New Brunswick and Nova Scotia, modern day Acadia. He designed many churches and public buildings, a number of which are now protected for their architectural significance.

Life
Born in Montreal, Quebec, Fréchet obtained a degree in architecture from Laval University in 1898 and the same year he obtained a job with the Intercolonial Railway as an architect. Two years later, in 1900, he moved to Moncton, New Brunswick, for the railway, and resided at the Minto Hotel. In 1905, he opened his own architecture firm, developing a specialty in religious and domestic architecture. However, he was not limited to these architectural fields. Notably, he designed the Capitol Theater in Moncton in the mid-1920s.

Fréchet became involved in the Acadian community. In 1903, he married Elvina Cormier, daughter of local merchant Simon Cormier. Fréchet was a member of the provisional management team for the French-language Acadian newspaper , a founding member of the revitalized newspaper (1920s, see Valentin Landry), a city councillor for Moncton City Council for several years, and a member of Société Nationale l'Assomption.

René-Arthur Fréchet died on May 28, 1950, in Moncton. Two days later, Émery Leblanc published a letter in L'Évangéline in memory of  Frechet, highlighting his accomplishments.

Works
In Moncton: 
 Mary's Home 
 Provincial Bank of Canada
 Brunswick Hotel (now Crowne Plaza, significantly altered)
 Capitol Theatre
 Academy of the Sacred Heart 
 St. Bernard's Roman Catholic Church
 Hôtel-Dieu and nurse's residence
 Good Shepherd Sisters Building (now the Léopold-Taillon Building, University of Moncton)

Elsewhere in New Brunswick:
 Saint-Antoine l'Ermite Church, Saint-Antoine
 St. Joseph's Church, Shediac 
 Léger Pharmacy, Shediac (1912)
 Church of St. Francis Xavier, Charlo 
 21 Gray Street, Fredericton (1919)
 John Peck House, Hillsborough (1919)
 Creaghan Building, Miramichi (1924)
 Church of St. John the Baptist and St. Joseph, Tracadie (1925)
 Bourgeois House, Tracadie (1938)
 Government of Canada Building, North Head (1939)

In Nova Scotia 
 Memorial Church, Grand-Pré National Historic Site
 St. Bernard Church, St. Bernard, Nova Scotia

Legacy
In 2012, a park in the Sunny Brae neighbourhood of Moncton was named to recognize the legacy of René-Arthur-Fréchet. Fréchet had been virtually forgotten at the time of the park's naming, and in 2016 residents petitioned to have it given another name. The publicity revitalized his memory.

References

External links

Canadian architects
Acadia
1879 births
1950 deaths
Université Laval alumni